Mohammed al Maghrabi (born April 19, 1985) is a Libyan footballer. He currently plays for Ahly Tripoli in the Libyan Premier League. He has 34 caps for the Libyan national football team.

References

External links

1985 births
Living people
Libyan footballers
Libya international footballers
2012 Africa Cup of Nations players
Olympique Club de Khouribga players
Al-Ahli SC (Tripoli) players
Association football defenders
Libyan Premier League players